Robert Rackstraw (born 31 October 1965) is a British voice actor who has worked in various animated films, television shows and video games.

Career

Rackstraw has an extensive voiceover career over 20 years. He voiced the main villain Pew in The Legends of Treasure Island, Voracious, Attila and Farmer Farmer in Foxbusters, James in the UK and US versions of Thomas and Friends, Buster and George in The Koala Brothers, Professor Professor in The Secret Show, Mr. Messy, Mr. Noisy, Mr. Fussy, Mr. Tickle and Mr. Happy in the UK version of The Mr. Men Show, Dad in Dennis and Gnasher, Kwazii in The Octonauts, Roger and Isambard in Lavender Castle, and Captain Campion in Watership Down.

He wrote episodes of Avenger Penguins and Fantomcat.

He made his very first voice acting role as Dave the Policeman in the 1992 stop motion animated series Truckers.

He provided additional voices for Realms of the Haunting, Dragon Quest VIII: Journey of the Cursed King, Know Your Baddies: Professor Professor's Lectures, Star Wars: The Old Republic, Star Wars: The Old Republic - Rise of the Hutt Cartel, Star Wars: The Old Republic - Knights of the Fallen Empire and Star Wars: The Old Republic - Knights of the Eternal Throne.

He played Garibald Tarwick, Meeren Slave and Crow in the 2014 episodic graphic adventure fantasy drama video game Game of Thrones: A Telltale Games Series.

He voiced Taraba Ninja in Shinobido: Way of the Ninja, Vadim Sokow in Anno 2070, Director Abbas Mokhtar in The Raven, Dan in Containment and Magical Duck in Sophia Grace & Rosie's Royal Adventure.

He voiced Adam, Hector Laine and Shears in the 2013 adventure video game Broken Sword 5: The Serpent Curse.

He provided various voices for Retribution, Venetica and Sherlock Holmes: The Devils Daughter.

He voiced as an Announcer and Death Eater in the 2010 two-part action-adventure video game Harry Potter and the Deathly Hallows – Part 1 and provided additional character voices in Harry Potter and the Deathly Hallows – Part 2. He also voiced the Snow Tubby in the 2015 reboot of classic British children’s television series Teletubbies.

He played Finger Bob and Finger Pete in Zemanovaload and Rufus in Renart the Fox.

He provided the voice of John Steinbeck in the 2014 documentary film I (Heart) Berlin.

He played various characters such as Savolla, Olaf, Salamandra Bandit, Salamandra Mage, Citizens and Knights in the 2007 action role-playing hack and slash video game The Witcher developed by CD Projekt Red and published by Atari. It is based on the novel series of the same name by Polish author Andrzej Sapkowski.

Filmography

Film

Television

Video games

References

External links
 

1965 births
Living people
20th-century English male actors
21st-century English male actors
British male television writers
English male voice actors
English television writers
People from Sunderland
Male actors from Tyne and Wear